Klemen Lavrič (born 12 June 1981) is a Slovenian former footballer who played as a striker.

Club career
Born in Trbovlje, Lavrič started playing football for domestic Rudar Trbovlje and later moved to Rudar Velenje. Hajduk Split was the first club outside of Slovenia for which he played, followed by Inter Zaprešić in Croatia. After this, Lavrič moved to German club Dynamo Dresden.

In the 2004–05 season he was voted the second best player of 2. Bundesliga, only beaten by Lukas Podolski. In the match against Rot-Weiß Erfurt, Lavrič scored in 66th minute a goal with a bicycle kick which was later voted as Goal of the Year in 2004 in Germany. In summer 2005, Lavrič joined Bundesliga MSV Duisburg. In 2005–06 season he scored six goals in 22 matches, but nevertheless Duisburg was relegated to the 2. Bundesliga. In the 2006–07 season, Lavrič scored 12 goals and was second team's leading scorer and sixth scorer in the second league. Duisburg was promoted again in the following season to the Bundesliga, but Lavrič received little opportunity for play and eventually also lost his place in the Slovenian national team.

After one year in Japan with Omiya Ardija he returned to Europe, this time playing for SK Sturm Graz in Austria (26 matches, 8 goals). In 2011, Lavrič played for FC St. Gallen 1879 where he scored in his debut match.

International career
He played 25 matches and scored six goals for the Slovenian senior team.

Career statistics

Club

International
Source:

International goals
Scores and results list Slovenia's goal tally first.

See also
Slovenian international players

References

External links
 
 

1981 births
Living people
People from Trbovlje
Slovenian footballers
Slovenia youth international footballers
Slovenia under-21 international footballers
Slovenia international footballers
Association football forwards
NK Rudar Velenje players
HNK Hajduk Split players
NK Inter Zaprešić players
Dynamo Dresden players
MSV Duisburg players
Omiya Ardija players
SK Sturm Graz players
Karlsruher SC players
Kapfenberger SV players
Slovenian PrvaLiga players
Croatian Football League players
Bundesliga players
2. Bundesliga players
Austrian Football Bundesliga players
J1 League players
Slovenian expatriate footballers
Slovenian expatriate sportspeople in Croatia
Slovenian expatriate sportspeople in Germany
Slovenian expatriate sportspeople in Japan
Slovenian expatriate sportspeople in Austria
Slovenian expatriate sportspeople in Switzerland
Expatriate footballers in Croatia
Expatriate footballers in Germany
Expatriate footballers in Japan
Expatriate footballers in Austria
Expatriate footballers in Switzerland